Carlos Alejandro Sierra Fumero (born 14 October 1974), known as Sandro, is a Spanish retired professional footballer who played as an attacking midfielder.

Club career
Born in Las Galletas, Santa Cruz de Tenerife, Canary Islands, Sandro began his professional career with Real Madrid's reserves, receiving his first-team debut on 10 September 1994 against CD Logroñés, under Jorge Valdano. He helped with 13 La Liga matches in that season's victorious campaign, but was soon pushed to the sidelines by another youth product, Guti.

After a stint with UD Las Palmas in the second division, Sandro dropped down to the third level in January 1998, and helped Málaga CF achieve a top flight promotion in just two seasons – he played 29 games in the latter, scoring once. In summer 1997, he had a trial at Newcastle United, but it did not lead to a contract.

In 2003, Sandro signed for Levante UD. Again used regularly in his first season, for another promotion, he featured very rarely in 2004–05's first division (only three appearances). The Valencians were eventually relegated, but he remained with them for a further year.

Sandro returned to Málaga for 2006–07, with the side again in division two. After the 2008 promotion, his contract expired and he retired; club chairman, former Madrid teammate Fernando Sanz, offered him a job as technical director which he accepted.

Honours

Club
Real Madrid
La Liga: 1994–95

Málaga
UEFA Intertoto Cup: 2002

Levante
Segunda División: 2003–04

Country
Spain U16
UEFA European Under-16 Championship: 1991

Spain U17
FIFA U-17 World Cup: Runner-up 1991

References

External links

1974 births
Living people
People from Tenerife
Sportspeople from the Province of Santa Cruz de Tenerife
Spanish footballers
Footballers from the Canary Islands
Association football midfielders
La Liga players
Segunda División players
Segunda División B players
Real Madrid Castilla footballers
Real Madrid CF players
UD Las Palmas players
Málaga CF players
Levante UD footballers
Spain youth international footballers
Spain under-21 international footballers